The Vagabond is a 1910 novel by the French writer Colette. It tells the story of a woman, Renée Néré, who after a divorce becomes a dancer in music halls. It was inspired by Colette's own experiences.

Synopsis

Divorced after eight years of her husband’s faithlessness and cruelty, Renée Néré has been struggling to support herself as a music-hall performer for the past three years. The first part of the three parts of the book opens as she waits in her dressing room until it is time for her to perform. She checks her make-up in the mirror that she hates to face, then goes off to perform, no longer anxious, but confident and controlled.
   
Renée’s life as an artist is described: her work as a dancer, her casual relations with her fellow performers, the small apartment that she shares with her maid, Blandine, and her dog Fossette, and her introduction to Maxime Dufferein-Chautel. Maxime presents himself at her dressing-room door one evening, and Renée dismisses him as an awkward intruder, charming and respectful as he seems to be. She more formally meets him again after a private engagement arranged by his brother. Night after night, Renée’s admirer watches her from the front row and patiently waits for her.

With her old friend Hamond acting as a go-between, Renée and Maxime slowly and slightly become more friendly. Maxime visits her; she acknowledges that she has an admirer, but nothing more. Eventually, their acquaintance deepens, but not into intimacy, despite Maxime’s pleas. This continues until Renée signs a contract for a six-week tour with Brague, her mentor, and his pupil. Now she must decide between Maxime and her career, as she recognizes that she cannot allow him to accompany her and is not yet ready to give up the wandering life, which somehow suits her. She then lies, promising to give herself to Maxime, but not until the tour is over. Renée leaves Paris, full of both hope and regret.
   
Renée travels from one place to another. This part of the story is told primarily in the form of letters to Maxime, sprinkled with accounts of performances, and thoughts about her relationship with him. The book ends with her final letter to him and the thoughts that she directs toward him as she leaves the letter are unfinished.

Reception
Frances Keene called The Vagabond an "enchanting, sincere and beautifully constructed novel" in a 1955 review for The New York Times. Keene complimented the book's English translation, but wrote: "It is a pity that its title has had to be transliterated. What 'La Vagabonde' means, of course, is 'The Wanderer,' as Renee Nere points out when considering second marriage: 'I shall have everything ... and I shall lean over the edge of a white terrace smothered with the roses of my gardens and shall see the lords of the earth, the wanderers, pass by!'" Keene ended the review: "Colette has the natural sober tone, the importance attached to feelings, the graceful brevity which Maurois once said 'define one of the forms of the French novel.' But above all her occasional hoarse cry of loss voices the complex anguish of our time."

In 2011, James Hopkin wrote about The Vagabond for The Guardian: "Has the novel dated in the course of a century? Not at all. There's enough energy and inventiveness here to blow away any dusty hints of antiquarian charm. And for years I've been telling people that no one writes about relationships as perceptively as Colette."

See also
 1910 in literature
 20th-century French literature

References

1910 French novels
Novels by Colette
Novels set in Paris